The 1985–86 season was Sport Lisboa e Benfica's 82nd season in existence and the club's 52nd consecutive season in the top flight of Portuguese football, covering the period from 1 July 1985 to 30 June 1986. Benfica competed domestically in the Primeira Divisão, Taça de Portugal and the Supertaça Cândido de Oliveira, and participated in the Cup Winners' Cup after winning the Taça de Portugal in the previous season.

In the new season, John Mortimore replaced Pál Csernai after the Hungarian underperformed at the helm. Only major signing was Rui Águas, but Benfica fought to kept a trio composed of Carlos Manuel, Diamantino Miranda and José Luís from leaving. In the league, Benfica started in erratic shape but quickly settled and racked up several consecutive wins. They ended 1985 in first place and having the Supertaça Cândido de Oliveira, their second Supertaça. In the first months of new year, Benfica kept their first place, while knocking out Porto and Sporting from the Portuguese Cup. In April, the season took a dramatic turn when Benfica lost at home to Sporting and were matched in first place by Porto, who confirmed their title a week later. Nonetheless, Benfica finished the month by lifting their 20th Taça de Portugal against Belenenses.

Season summary
Benfica started the new season with a change in leadership. The performance under Pál Csernai in 1984–85 was disappointing, so it was only expectable that he would be replaced. In late April, John Mortimore, was selected as his replacement. The club made some adjustments in the transfer window but the biggest signing was Rui Águas. The summer story instead revolved around the contract extensions for Carlos Manuel, Diamantino Miranda and José Luís. Particularly, Carlos Manuel, who was rumoured to move to Braga.
In July, all three agreed terms and signed their extensions, ending the impasse. The pre-season began on 11 July, with three preparation games scheduled for late July. Benfica then took part in the regional Taça de Honra and in the Lisbon International Tournament, winning both.

The league campaign started with the Clássico with Porto, with Benfica losing 2–0. The next week, Benfica defeated Marítimo by 9–0, and then lost again, now with Vitória de Guimarães. They followed that with a draw against Vitória de Setúbal. On the third weekend of September, Benfica opened the new third tier of Estádio da Luz, taking advantage of the week off from the first round of the Cup Winners' Cup. Because of the Heysel Stadium disaster, their opponent, Manchester United was banned. In October, in their debut in Europe, Benfica eliminated Sampdoria. Domestically, the league had much improve and by 25 November, Benfica was only a point shy of first place. In early December, Benfica drew in Antas and won their second Supertaça Cândido de Oliveira, after having previously beat them by one-nil at home. On 21 December, Benfica drew with Sporting, which levelled the Big Three at the top with 22 points. Closing the year, Benfica defeated Boavista and lapped the first round of the league in first place, after recovering five points since September.

After an event-less January, in which Benfica retained their one-point lead over Sporting; in February, Benfica faced Porto again, this time for the round of 16 of the Taça de Portugal, winning 2–1. Meanwhile, in the Primeira Divisão, they added another point in their lead over their closest competitors. In March, Benfica was eliminated of the Cup Winners' Cup by Dukla Prague, while in the Portuguese Cup, they thrashed Sporting by 5–0 in the quarter-finals. They finished the month with a replay of the match with Salgueiros, which had been postponed in February because of the pitch conditions. They drew 1–1 and lost points in title race.

In April, Benfica received Sporting in what was labelled the D-Day for the league. Despite leading the league for most of second round, they lost 2–1, which allowed Porto to catch them in the first place, with a better head-to-head record. Mortimore said: "Sporting had two chances and converted them both, we had lost the league". On the last day of the campaign, Porto beat last classified, Sporting da Covilhã and won the league, while Benfica lost in Bessa with Boavista. Benfica reacted in the best way and qualified for the Taça de Portugal Final, where they defeated Belenenses to lift their 20th Taça de Portugal. After the win, Manuel Bento said: "The bastards won the Cup after all". He also approached the loss of the league title with: "forces too powerful took away our title."

Competitions

Overall record

Supertaça Cândido de Oliveira

Primeira Divisão

League table

Results by round

Matches

Taça de Portugal

European Cup Winners' Cup

Second round

Quarter-final

Friendlies

Player statistics
The squad for the season consisted of the players listed in the tables below, as well as staff member John Mortimore (manager),  Toni (assistant manager), Eusébio (assistant manager).

Transfers

In

Out

Out by loan

Notes

References

Bibliography
 
 
 
 

S.L. Benfica seasons
Benfica